Alena Vasilyeuna Abramchuk, née Kapiets (born 14 February 1988) is a Belarusian track and field athlete who competes in the shot put. She was the bronze medallist at the 2013 European Athletics Indoor Championships.

Career
She began competing at national level as a teenager and made her international debut at the 2006 World Junior Championships in Athletics, competing in both the shot put and discus throw events. Her first international medals followed in 2007 with silver medals in the shot put at the 2007 European Athletics Junior Championships and in the under-23 section at the 2007 European Cup Winter Throwing. She was also fifth at the Military World Games. She began attending A.S. Pushkin Brest State University, studying in the physical education department.

She improved her best to  that season and claimed a trio of bronze medals at the European Team Championships, Summer Universiade and the European Athletics U23 Championships. She added two centimetres to her best in 2010, but did not compete internationally.

Abramchuk won her first national title indoors in February 2011 then claimed her first international win at the 2011 European Cup Winter Throwing, beating France's Jessica Cérival. She made her debut on the IAAF Diamond League circuit in Shanghai and ranked fifth at the Universiade. Another best of  the following February saw her again ranked in the world's top twenty in 2012. She failed to match this form in major competition, being eliminated at the 2012 IAAF World Indoor Championships and placing fifth at the 2012 European Cup Winter Throwing.

A bronze medal at the 2013 European Athletics Indoor Championships – her first podium finish at a major championship – marked a new high. She was the national champion indoors and outdoors that year and regularly threw beyond eighteen metres in competition. She placed second to Russia's Yevgeniya Kolodko at the 2013 European Cup Winter Throwing and had several top five finishes on the 2013 IAAF Diamond League circuit.

In the 2014 season she was eliminated in the qualifiers of the 2014 IAAF World Indoor Championships, but made the final of the 2014 European Athletics Championships, coming in ninth place. At the 2014 European Cup Winter Throwing she was again beaten by Kolodko of Russia. She came close to another continental bronze at the 2015 European Athletics Indoor Championships, beating narrowly beaten into fourth by Radoslava Mavrodieva.

National titles
Belarusian Athletics Championships
Shot put: 2013
Discus throw: 2015
Belarusian Indoor Championships
Shot put: 2011, 2013, 2014

International competitions

References

External links
 
 
 

Living people
1988 births
Belarusian female shot putters
World Athletics Championships athletes for Belarus
Belarusian State University alumni
Olympic athletes of Belarus
Athletes (track and field) at the 2016 Summer Olympics
Universiade medalists in athletics (track and field)
Universiade bronze medalists for Belarus
Competitors at the 2011 Summer Universiade
Medalists at the 2009 Summer Universiade
People from Stolin District
Sportspeople from Brest Region